Hexaconazole is a broad-spectrum systemic triazole fungicide used for the control of many fungi particularly ascomycetes and basidiomycetes. Major consumption is in Asian countries and it is used mainly for the control of rice sheath blight in China, India, Vietnam, and parts of East Asia. It is also used for control of diseases in various fruits and vegetables.

References

External links
 

Chloroarenes
Lanosterol 14α-demethylase inhibitors
Triazole antifungals
Butyl compounds